Sir Thomas Fairbairn, 2nd Baronet (18 January 1823 - 12 August 1891) was an English industrialist and art collector.

Fairbairn was born in the Polygon in Ardwick, near the centre of Manchester.  He was the third of eight surviving children of Sir William Fairbairn (1789–1874).  His father was a Scottish engineer who moved to Manchester in the early 19th century, where he designed bridges, and established a business, William Fairbairn & Sons, that was involved in iron founding, boilermaking, ship building, and manufacturing steam locomotives.  He was a nephew of Peter Fairbairn of Leeds - also an engineer like his brother - and first cousin of MP Andrew Fairbairn.

After a private education, Thomas Fairbairn worked in his father's businesses from 1840, and took charge of the firm's shipbuilding operation in Millwall.  After a tour of Italy in 1841–2, he started to use his industrial wealth to collect paintings.

He married Allison Callaway on 23 March 1848 and settled back in Manchester.  They had at least five children together.  Two—his son Arthur and daughter Constance—were born deaf.

Fairbairn was impressed by the works of William Holman Hunt exhibited at the 1853 Royal Academy exhibition, and commissioned Hunt to complete his 1853 painting The Awakening Conscience, although he asked Hunt to repaint the expression of the female figure.  He also persuaded Hunt to make changes to his 1854 painting The Scapegoat.   Fairbairn commissioned a group portrait of his wife and five children from Hunt in 1864, which became his The Children's Holiday.  Although he acquired portraits from Hunt, Fairbairn generally preferred Pre-Raphaelite landscapes and historical painting.  He commissioned paintings by Edward Lear, and sculptures by Thomas Woolner, including a life-sized marble sculpture of his two deaf children in 1857–1862.

Fairburn was a commissioner of the 1851 Great Exhibition, and chairman of the Executive Committee that organised the 1857 Art Treasures Exhibition in Manchester, selecting the firm that built the temporary exhibition building, C. D. Young & Co, who were already building the Museum of Science and Art in South Kensington (later the Victoria and Albert Museum).  His friend Augustus Egg was appointed as director of the gallery of Modern Masters at the exhibition, with many of Fairburn's favourite Pre-Raphaelites being selected.  He was responsible for the decision to purchase Jules Soulages's collection for £13,500, to form the core of the collection of medieval and Renaissance decorative arts.  It was later sold in instalments to the V&A.  Fairbairn was offered a knighthood for his efforts, but declined.

Fairbairn worked on the International Exhibitions of 1862, 1867 and 1871.  From 1860, he struggled with a project to open a new, free new art gallery for Manchester, which finally opened as the City Art Gallery in 1882.  He was elected to the Royal Commission for the Exhibition of 1851 in May 1861.  In around 1862, he moved to Burton Park, near Petworth in Sussex, but moved to Brambridge House, in Bishopstoke near Southampton, by 1866.  He was High Sheriff of Hampshire in 1870 and succeeded his father as 2nd Baronet in 1874.

Many of his pictures were auctioned off in the 1890s, and the remainder of the collection was broken up after his death from a stroke.  He died in Bishopstoke, in Hampshire, and was buried at Twyford church.

References
Fairbairn, Thomas Oliver Garnett. In Grove Art Online. Oxford Art Online, (accessed February 19, 2010).
Judith Bronkhurst, ‘Fairbairn, Sir Thomas, second baronet (1823–1891)’, Oxford Dictionary of National Biography, Oxford University Press, 2004 accessed 19 Feb 2010
Sir Thomas Fairbairn, 2nd Bt.

1823 births
1891 deaths
English art collectors
English industrialists
High Sheriffs of Hampshire
Baronets in the Baronetage of the United Kingdom
People from Bishopstoke
19th-century English businesspeople